A night safari is a nocturnal visit to a zoo or wildlife-spotting natural area. The term was first used by the Night Safari, Singapore, which opened in 1994.
While the term generally applies to zoos or facilities that allow visitors to view animals within enclosures or fenced areas, the term is expanding to include viewing of wildlife in national parks and other natural areas, such as in Laos.

List of night safari parks
 Chiang Mai Night Safari in Chiang Mai, Thailand
 Night Safari, Singapore
 South Luangwa National Park in Mfuwe, Zambia
 Zoo Taiping in Taiping, Perak, Malaysia
 Kukrail Forest Area in Lucknow, Uttar Pradesh, India

Gallery

See also
 Safari

References

Night Safari Singapore website
Nam Nern Night Safari Laos website

Zoology
Zoos